Roland Repiský (born 30 May 1990) is a Slovak football goalkeeper who currently plays for the Slovak Corgoň Liga club MFK Košice.

References

External links
 at mfkkosice.sk 

1990 births
Living people
Slovak footballers
Association football goalkeepers
FC VSS Košice players
Slovak Super Liga players